The teletransportation paradox or teletransport paradox (also known in alternative forms as the duplicates paradox) is a thought experiment on the philosophy of identity that challenges common intuitions on the nature of self and consciousness, formulated by Derek Parfit in his 1984, book Reasons and Persons.

The Polish science-fiction writer Stanisław Lem described the same problem in the mid-twentieth century. He put it in writing in his philosophical text "Dialogs",  in 1957. Similarly, in Lem's Star Diaries  ("Fourteenth Voyage") of 1957, the hero visits a planet and finds himself recreated from a backup record, after his death from a meteorite strike, which on this planet is a very commonplace procedure.

Similar questions of identity have been raised as early as 1775.

Derek Parfit's version

Derek Parfit and others consider a hypothetical "teletransporter", a machine that puts you to sleep, records your molecular composition, breaking you down into atoms, and relaying it to Mars at the speed of light.  On Mars, another machine re-creates you (from local stores of carbon, hydrogen, and so on), each atom in exactly the same relative position.  Parfit poses the question of whether or not the teletransporter is actually a method of travel, or if it simply kills and makes an exact replica of the user.

Then the teleporter is upgraded. The teletransporter on Earth is modified to not destroy the person who enters it, but instead it can simply make infinite replicas, all of whom would claim to remember entering the teletransporter on Earth in the first place.

Using thought experiments such as these, Parfit argues that any criteria we attempt to use to determine sameness of person will be lacking, because there is no further fact.  What matters, to Parfit, is simply "Relation R", psychological connectedness, including memory, personality, and so on.

Parfit continues this logic to establish a new context for morality and social control. He cites that it is morally wrong for one person to harm or interfere with another person and it is incumbent on society to protect individuals from such transgressions. That accepted, it is a short extrapolation to conclude that it is also incumbent on society to protect an individual's "Future Self" from such transgressions; tobacco use could be classified as an abuse of a Future Self's right to a healthy existence. Parfit resolves the logic to reach this conclusion, which appears to justify incursion into personal freedoms, but he does not explicitly endorse such invasive control.

Parfit's conclusion is similar to David Hume's view and also to the view of the self in some forms of Buddhism, though it does not restrict itself to a mere reformulation of them. For besides being reductive, Parfit's view is also deflationary: in the end, "what matters" is not personal identity, but rather mental continuity and connectedness.

See also
 Anatta, the Buddhist doctrine of the non-existence of the self
 Ship of Theseus
 The Prestige (2006 film)
 Moon (2009 film)
 Oblivion (2013 film)
 To Be (1990 film)
 Soma (video game)
 Stream of consciousness (psychology)
 Think Like a Dinosaur (The Outer Limits)
 Transporter (Star Trek)
 Heaven Sent (Doctor Who)

References

Sources

External links
 The Identity of Theseus: Ship and Man – The Oculus: The Virginia Journal of Undergraduate Research, Spring 2012, Volume 11 Issue 1, page 60
 The Duplicates Paradox (The Duplicates Problem) – Ben Best
 Downloading Consciousness – Jordan Inafuku, Katie Lampert, Brad Lawson, Shaun Stehly, Alex Vaccaro
The Trouble with Transporters – CGP Grey

Paradoxes
Teleportation
Thought experiments
Thought experiments in philosophy
Cloning